Jonathan "Jon" Yates Hardister is a Republican member of the North Carolina House of Representatives. He has represented the 59th district (including constituents in eastern Guilford County) since 2013.  He is currently serving as the Majority Whip for the North Carolina House of Representatives.

Hardister is a Greensboro, NC native and graduated from Grimsley High School and Greensboro College.

Committee assignments

2021-2022 session
Appropriations (Vice Chair)
Appropriations - Education (Chair)
Education - Universities (Chair)
Alcoholic Beverage Control (Vice Chair)
UNC BOG Nominations(Vice Chair)
Judiciary II
Redistricting
Rules, Calendar, and Operations of the House

2019-2020 session
Appropriations (Vice Chair)
Appropriations - Capital (Chair)
Education - K-12
Alcoholic Beverage Control (Vice Chair)
Banking (Vice Chair)
Election Law and Campaign Finance Reform
Rules, Calendar, and Operations of the House

2017-2018 session
Appropriations (Vice Chair)
Appropriations - Capital (Chair)
Appropriations - Information Technology
Education - K-12
Alcoholic Beverage Control (Vice Chair)
Banking (Vice Chair)
Elections and Ethics Law
Rules, Calendar, and Operations of the House

2015-2016 session
Appropriations
Appropriations - Capital (Chair)
Education - K-12
Alcoholic Beverage Control (Chair)
Banking
Elections
Judiciary I
Transportation

2013-2014 session
Banking (Vice Chair)
Education
Agriculture
Finance
Judiciary

Electoral history

2020

2018

2016

2014

2012

2010

References

Living people
1982 births
People from Greensboro, North Carolina
Greensboro College alumni
21st-century American politicians
Republican Party members of the North Carolina House of Representatives